The Virgin Suicides is a score composed by French electronic music duo Air for the 1999 film of the same name by Sofia Coppola. It was released on 23 February 2000 by Virgin Records. The album was nominated for Best Soundtrack at the 2001 Brit Awards. The French edition of Rolling Stone magazine placed The Virgin Suicides at number 49 on their list of the 100 essential French rock albums. In 2014, NME placed the album at number 11 on their "61 of the Greatest Film Soundtracks Ever" list. In 2019, Pitchfork placed the album at number four on their "Top 50 Best Movie Scores of All Time" list.

On 3 June 2010, Air performed the full score with the band Hot Rats (with members of Supergrass) at the Cité de la Musique in Paris.

To celebrate the 15th anniversary of the film The Virgin Suicides, a deluxe edition of the album was released in June 2015 as a two-disc set and a super deluxe box set. The former contains two studio outtakes on disc one and a bonus disc of previously unreleased live recordings, while the latter includes the album on 180-gram red vinyl, an exclusive picture disc featuring previously unreleased live recordings, the "Playground Love" EP on 180-gram red vinyl, the two-disc deluxe edition of The Virgin Suicides on CD, a 16-page booklet featuring an unpublished Air interview, a film poster, a replica VIP laminate pass and a download card.

Background
According to Jean-Benoît Dunckel, the album was recorded quickly. At first the music was inspired by the film and an attempt was made to synchronise the music with scenes from the film; towards the end of the process, the intention was to craft songs which could be listened to on their own.

Critical reception

The Virgin Suicides received generally positive reviews from music critics. At Metacritic, which assigns a normalised rating out of 100 to reviews from mainstream publications, the album received an average score of 77, based on 16 reviews. In a 2020 review of the score, NPR's Paula Mejía praised the music for capturing the spirit of being a teenager, concluding, "Listening to the Virgin Suicides score on loop hasn't been so much an exercise in nostalgia, or even a means of escape. Reliving it is more of a prescient reminder—one I needed to hear as a teenager, and that I could use again today—that now is not forever."

Track listing

Personnel
Credits adapted from the liner notes of The Virgin Suicides.

 Air – production, recording
 Gordon Tracks – vocals, drums 
 Hugo Ferran – saxophone 
 Brian Reitzell – drums 
 Pascal Garnon – drum recording
 Stéphane "Alf" Briat – mixing
 Mike Mills – drawing

Charts

Certifications and sales

Release history

Notes

References

2000 soundtrack albums
2000s film soundtrack albums
Air (French band) albums
Ambient albums by French artists
Ambient soundtracks
Film scores
Rock albums by French artists
Rock soundtracks
Virgin Records soundtracks